Peter Wenzel is a former Australian alpine skier who competed at the 1964 Winter Olympics. He was a reserve and was called in to compete after Ross Milne died in a training accident soon before the games. He came 68th out of 77 competitors in the slalom and was 68th out of 80 in the giant slalom.

Notes

References
 

Year of birth missing (living people)
Australian male alpine skiers
Alpine skiers at the 1964 Winter Olympics
Olympic alpine skiers of Australia
Place of birth missing (living people)
Living people